Indian Bottom was an unincorporated community in Letcher County, Kentucky, United States. It had a post office as of 1915, which closed on an unknown date.

References

Unincorporated communities in Letcher County, Kentucky
Unincorporated communities in Kentucky
Coal towns in Kentucky